Bose Ogunboye  (born 17 April 1976) known professionally as Lepacious Bose is a Nigerian comedienne and Nollywood actress. In 2014, she won the 2014 Golden Icons Academy Movie Awards for Best Comedic Act category award in the movie “Being Mrs Elliot” beating other 6 contestants.

Filmography 

 Makate Must Sell (2019)
 200 Million (2018)
 Chief Daddy (2018)
 Gidi Blues
 Gidi Blues (2016)
 First Class (2016)
 Being Mrs Elliot
 A Long Night (2014)
 Tunnel (2014)

Awards and nominations

References

External links 
 
 

Living people
1976 births
Actresses from Ibadan
University of Ibadan alumni
Nigerian women comedians
Nigerian film actresses
Yoruba actresses
21st-century Nigerian actresses
Actresses from Oyo State
People from Oyo State